The Ameland Lighthouse, commonly known as Bornrif, is a lighthouse on the Dutch island Ameland, one of the Frisian Islands, on the edge of the North Sea. It was built in 1880 by order of William III of the Netherlands. It was designed by Dutch lighthouse architect Quirinus Harder and built by the foundry Nering Bögel in Deventer. The individual segments were shipped to Ameland and welded together on-site.

After World War II a new, weaker lamp was installed, which was replaced by a stronger lamp in 1952. The lighthouse is a Rijksmonument since 1982. Since the end of 2004 it is owned by Ameland, and it was opened for tourists in 2005. The tower has a space for exhibitions.

The optical installation came from the former Westhoofd Lighthouse in Ouddorp.

Opening hours
Summer: Sunday and Monday 1PM - 5PM and Tuesday - Saturday 10AM - 5PM. Wednesday - Saturday also open 7PM - 10PM.
Winter: Wednesdays and weekends,  11AM - 4PM, Saturday 10PM - 11PM

See also

 List of lighthouses in the Netherlands

Notes

External links

Lighthouses completed in 1880
Lighthouses in Friesland
Rijksmonuments in Friesland
Ameland